Chika (Chíkà) is an Igbo name meaning 'God is supreme', it's made of the words chí 'God, universe, originator', and kà 'greater, superior'

People
 Chika (rapper), born Jane Chika Oranika, Nigerian-American rapper
 Chika Amalaha (born 1997), Nigerian weightlifter
 Chika Anadu, Nigerian filmmaker
 Chika Chukwumerije (born 1983), Nigerian taekwondo practitioner
 Victoria Chika Ezerim, Nigerian taekwondo practitioner
 Chika Ike (born 1985), Nigerian entertainer and businessperson
 Chika Lann, Nigerian filmmaker, actress, former model and television personality
 Matthias Chika Mordi (born 1967), Nigerian Financial Expert
 Chika Oduah (born 1986), Nigerian-American journalist
 Chika Okeke-Agulu (born 1966), Nigerian artist, art historian, art curator, and blogger
 Chika Okpala (born 1950), Nigerian comedian.
 Chika Stacy Oriuwa, Nigerian-Canadian physician
 Eze Chika Philip (born 1993), Nigerian footballer
 Chika Unigwe (born 1974), Nigerian-born author
 Chika Wali (born 1990), Nigerian football player

See also

 Chica (name)
 Chicka (disambiguation)
 Chika (general name)
 Chika (Japanese given name)
 Chika (disambiguation)
 Chiki

Igbo names
Igbo given names

pl:Chika